Ariagner Steven Smith Medina (born 13 December 1998) is a Nicaraguan international footballer who plays as a striker for Latvian club FK Spartaks and the Nicaragua national team.

Career

Club
He has played club football for Real Estelí and Spartaks Jūrmala. In 2015 he trained with Italian club Udinese.

On 7 February 2022, Smith signed for A Lyga club Panevėžys on loan for the season.

International
Smith made his international debut for Nicaragua in 2017.

Career statistics

Club

International

References

1998 births
Living people
Nicaraguan men's footballers
People from Madriz Department
Association football forwards
Nicaragua international footballers
Nicaraguan Primera División players
Real Estelí F.C. players
Latvian Higher League players
FK Spartaks Jūrmala players
FC Qizilqum Zarafshon players
PFC Lokomotiv Tashkent players
FC Sputnik Rechitsa players
FC Veles Moscow players
FK Panevėžys players
Uzbekistan Super League players
Russian First League players
Nicaraguan expatriate footballers
Nicaraguan expatriate sportspeople in Latvia
Expatriate footballers in Latvia
Nicaraguan expatriate sportspeople in Uzbekistan
Expatriate footballers in Uzbekistan
Nicaraguan expatriate sportspeople in Belarus
Expatriate footballers in Belarus
Nicaraguan expatriate sportspeople in Russia
Expatriate footballers in Russia
Nicaraguan expatriate sportspeople in Lithuania
Expatriate footballers in Lithuania